Arsha Amartsumovna Ovanesova (1906 – 1990) was a Soviet Armenian documentary film director, screenplay writer, actress, and educator.

Biography 
Arsha Ovanesova was born on December 23, 1906 in either Shusha or Baku, in the Russian Empire (now Azerbaijan). At the age of 13, her mother died. From 1918 to 1919, she lived in Persia to escape the Russian Revolution and the Islamic Army of the Caucasus; followed by a moved in 1920 to Baku.

She attended Gerasimov Institute of Cinematography (VGIK) from 1926 to 1932, where she graduated from. From 1931 to 1961, Ovanesova was a director at the Soyuzkinohronika (now Russian Central Studio of Documentary Films). She helped found , as well as serving as the director and editor of the  filmed newsreel from 1931 to 1946. Her film Unusual Encounters (1958) traces the lives of the people in the early publication of Pioneer, spanning 20 years. She taught film at Gerasimov Institute of Cinematography, starting in 1947.

In 1943, she became a member of the Communist Party of the Soviet Union (CPSU). She was a Honored Art Worker of the RSFSR (1947). In 1950 she received the Stalin Prize (later known as the USSR State Prize) and the International Peace Prize. 

She died on May 6, 1990 and is buried at Troyekurovskoye Cemetery in Moscow. Ovanesova was married to cameraman , who survived her.

Filmography

Writer 
 1949, World Youth Festival
 1954, The Secret of Mountain Lake

Director 
 1940, Pioneer Truth
 1946, A Story About Our Children
 1948, 30 Years of the Komsomol
 1949, World Youth Festival, a documentary about the World Festival of Youth and Students event.
 1958, Unusual Encounters

References

External links 
 

1906 births
1990 deaths
Soviet film directors
Soviet film actresses
Soviet screenwriters
Gerasimov Institute of Cinematography alumni
Academic staff of the Gerasimov Institute of Cinematography
Recipients of the USSR State Prize
Communist Party of the Soviet Union members
Soviet Armenians
Soviet women film directors